Pycnothele is a genus of South American mygalomorph spiders in the family Pycnothelidae. First described by Ralph Vary Chamberlin in 1917, it was moved to the funnel-web trapdoor spiders in 1985, but moved back to Pycnothelidae in 2020. It is a senior synonym of Agersborgia and Androthelopsis.

Species
 it contains 12 species, found in Argentina, Uruguay, and Brazil:
Pycnothele arapongas Passanha, Indicatti, Brescovit & Lucas, 2014 – Brazil
Pycnothele araraquara Passanha, Indicatti, Brescovit & Lucas, 2014 – Brazil
Pycnothele auripila (Mello-Leitão, 1946) – Uruguay
Pycnothele auronitens (Keyserling, 1891) – Brazil
Pycnothele gauderio Passanha, Indicatti, Brescovit & Lucas, 2014 – Brazil
Pycnothele gigas (Vellard, 1925) – Brazil
Pycnothele jatai Passanha, Indicatti, Brescovit & Lucas, 2014 – Brazil
Pycnothele labordai (Pérez-Miles, Costa & Montes de Oca, 2014) – Brazil, Uruguay
Pycnothele modesta (Schiapelli & Gerschman, 1942) – Uruguay, Argentina
Pycnothele perdita Chamberlin, 1917 (type) – Brazil
Pycnothele rubra Passanha, Indicatti, Brescovit & Lucas, 2014 – Brazil
Pycnothele singularis (Mello-Leitão, 1934) – Brazil

Formerly included:
P. piracicabensis (Piza, 1938) (Transferred to Rachias)

See also
 List of Pycnothelidae species

References

Further reading

Mygalomorphae genera
Pycnothelidae
Spiders of South America